Indru Pol Endrum Vaazhga is a 1977 Indian Tamil-language film, directed by K. Shankar, starring M. G. Ramachandran and Radha Saluja. It was released on 5 May 1977.

Plot 
Murugan is a do-gooder who loves his village and the village loves him. Murugan's betrothed, Ganga, insults him and his village when they start talking about solemnizing the marriage stating that she would marry only a educated, stylish, well-to-do man. Because he was insulted by his betrothed, Murugan vows to find a bride who is more stylish and better educated than her. He leaves for the city with the villager's blessings.

There he meets Menaka who is the daughter of Pandari Bai and sister of Kumar. Unknown to Murugan, Kumar is the guy who Ganga was in love with and was cheated by him. He impresses Menaka with his simplicity, honesty and integrity. With the blessings of Guruviah, a man who lost his leg while saving Menaka when she was a child, he makes her see people matter more than money. They propose marriage as she falls in love but Kumar stands in the way. Kumar is exposed as Ganga's lover and when all insist on him marrying Ganga, he takes her at gun point and goes to kidnap her. He is finally subdued by Murugan who reforms him and gets the married as he marries Menaka.

Cast 
 M. G. Ramachandran as Murugan
 Radha Saluja as Menaka
 Vijayakumar as Kumar
 M. N. Nambiar as Guruviah
 Thengai Srinivasan as "All in All" Arunachalam
 K. Kannan as Kanna, Kumar's manager
 V. Gopalakrishnan as Gobi
 S. V. Sahasranamam as Maya's father
 Trichy Soundararajan as K. P. Swamy (alias Kuppuswamy), Ganga's father
 Vennira Aadai Nirmala as Ganga, Kumar's lover
 Pandari Bai as Kumar and Menaka's mother
 Peeli Sivam as Villager
 S. N. Lakshmi as Maya's mother
 Karikol Raju as Villager
 Idichapuli Selvaraj as Kuppuswamy's secretary
 Samikkannu as Villager
 T. K. S. Natarajan as Housekeeper

Production 
The dialogues for the film were written by former MLA K. Kalimuthu. This was Radha Saluja's last film with M. G. Ramachandran.

Soundtrack 
Soundtrack was composed by M. S. Viswanathan. The songs "Anbukku Naan Adimai" and "Idhu Nattai Kaakum" were well received and, extensively promoted by Ramachandran during his election campaigns. An article in The Washington Post noted that both songs were instrumental in the All India Anna Dravida Munnetra Kazhagam's victory in the 1977 Indian general election in Tamil Nadu.

Reception 
Kanthan of Kalki appreciated the photography, direction and music, but criticised the title's lack of relevance to the story.

References

External links 

1970s Tamil-language films
1977 films
Films directed by K. Shankar
Films scored by M. S. Viswanathan